Midnight Life is a 1928 silent mystery film produced by independent Gotham Company and distributed by B movie studios Lumas Films. The film is based on a novel, The Spider's Web, by Reginald Wright Kauffman. It was directed by Scott R. Dunlap and stars Francis X. Bushman and Gertrude Olmstead. This film is preserved at the Library of Congress.

Cast
Francis X. Bushman as Jim Logan
Gertrude Olmstead as Betty Brown
Edward Buzzell as Eddie Delaney
Monte Carter as Steve Saros
Cosmo Kyrle Bellew as Harlan Phillips
Carlton S. King

References

External links
Midnight Life at IMDb.com
allmovie/synopsis

1928 films
American silent feature films
Films based on American novels
1928 mystery films
American black-and-white films
Films directed by Scott R. Dunlap
American mystery films
Films produced by Samuel Sax
Gotham Pictures films
1920s American films
Silent mystery films
1920s English-language films